AC Diomidis Argous  is a multi-sports club from Argos, Greece. Their most successful department, is the handball section of the club. They currently compete in the Greek handball championship. Popularly nicknamed the "wolves", the team won for the first time the EHF Challenge Cup in 2012, downing in the final Wacker Thun. It was also the first time a Greek team won a European title in a handball club competition. The victory was celebrated in Argos before a crowd of several thousand people.

Recent seasons

Achievements
EHF Challenge Cup
 Winners (1): 2011/12
Greek Championships
Winners (2): 2011/12, 2013/14
 Runners-up (3): 2012/13, 2014/15, 2015/16
Greek Cup
 Runners-up (2): 2013/14, 2019/20

European record

External links
 Official Website

Greek handball clubs
Multi-sport clubs in Greece
Argos, Peloponnese